Naïma Karamoko (born 30 September 1997) is a Swiss tennis player.

Karamoko has a career-high singles ranking by the WTA of 838, achieved on 20 February 2017. She also has a career-high WTA doubles ranking of 394, achieved on 21 November 2022.

Karamoko won her first major ITF title at the 2022 Elle Spirit Open, in the doubles draw partnering Inès Ibbou.

ITF Circuit finals

Doubles: 11 (9 titles, 2 runner-up)

References

External links

1997 births
Living people
Swiss female tennis players
21st-century Swiss women